John A. Thomson (April 9, 1922 – September 24, 1960) was an American racecar driver. Thomson was nicknamed "the Flying Scot." He won several championships in midgets and sprint cars before competing in Championship Car (now IndyCar) racing. He won the pole position for the 1959 Indianapolis 500.

Background
Thomsom was born on April 9, 1922 to William and Marion Ross Thomson. He graduated from Lowell High School then the New England Aircraft School.

He served in the United States Air Force as a crew chief during World War II in Corsica and Italy between 1942 and 1945 on a B-25 bomber. Thomson was awarded five service stars and the Distinguished Air Force Medal.

Thomson met his future wife Evelyn Peterson in 1951. He moved from the Springfield, Massachusetts area to a five-acre ranch that he built near Boyertown, Pennsylvania in the mid 1950s.

Midget cars
Thomson began watching races at a track across the street from his home in 1937 and 1938 in Lowell. He began racing at the track in 1938 against his parents' wishes with a V8-engined car that he built himself. After returning from the war, he resumed racing midgets at the Bay State Racing Association. His first win happened at Seekonk Speedway in 1946 and he won seven times in 1947. 

Thomson won the 1948 United Car Owners Association (UCOA) New England title after winning 32 midget events. He won his second UCOA title in 1949; he also race in some American Racing Drivers Club (ARDC) events. He switched to the ARDC in 1950 to finish fifth in points and took second in points in 1951.

He won the 1952 AAA Eastern division midget car championship after winning twice at Williams Grove Speedway.

Championship cars
He drove in the AAA and USAC Championship Car series, racing in the 1953-1960 seasons with 69 starts, including the Indianapolis 500 races in each season.  He finished in the top ten 43 times, with 7 victories.  His best Indy finish was third in 1959 after starting the race on the pole position. Roy Sherman, the first National Midget Champion, was his chief mechanic for several Indy 500s.

He won his first champ car race at the Milwaukee Mile in 1955. He ended up finishing third in season points after having to sit out the middle part of the season while healing from a end over end flip at the Langhorne Speedway circle. He clipped Jerry Hoyt's car while in the lead; he broke five ribs, bruised his vertebrae, broke his shoulder in eight places. In 1957, Thomson won at Langhorne; he also earned two pole positions. In October, he crashed at the California State Fairgrounds Race Track suffering internal injuries. In 1958, he finished third with wins at the Springfield Mile, DuQuoin State Fairgrounds, California Fairgrounds, and Syracuse Mile. He earned two pole positions in 13 starts. In 1959, he raced primarily in champ cars and finished third in national points after a win at Milwaukee plus three fast times. He had a wreck in a sprint car race at Williams Grove in September and missed the rest of the season.

He was the first driver to win a  dirt track race in less than an hour at Langhorne Speedway. His champ car's average speed was 100.174 miles per hour.

Sprint cars
Thomson made his first "Big Car" (now sprint car) start in September 1952 at the Vermont State Fairgrounds. He primarily raced on the AAA Eastern circuit in 1953; he finished ninth after winning at Altamont, New York. Thomson won the Eastern AAA Big Car championship in 1954 after winning eight events. AAA ended sanctioning after the 1955 season and it was replaced by the United States Automobile Club (USAC) in 1956. He continued in the Eastern Division in 1956 and had wins at Williams Grove, Trenton Speedway, and Reading Fairgrounds Speedway; he finished second in points behind Tommy Hinnershitz. Thomson's sprint car races in 1957 were primarily in the USAC Eastern division; he won twice at Reading and once at the Allentown fairgrounds to finish third in points. Thomas returned from injury to win the first 1958 USAC Sprint Car Series Eastern race at Williams Grove; he followed up with two wins at Reading and one at Allentown to win the Eastern championship.

Death
Thomson was racing in a USAC Sprint Car at the Great Allentown Fair on September 24, 1960. On a rutty and dry track, his car flipped and crashed through the backstretch fence and flipped into the infield. He was thrown out of the car and he was pinned underneath the car after it stopped rolling. His leg was broken and he died several hours later at Allentown General Hospital. His friend Tommy Hinnershitz announced his retirement from racing shortly after Thomson's death.

Thomson was survived by his wife and four sons (Dale, Dana, David and Darryl).

Career awards
Thomson was inducted in the National Sprint Car Hall of Fame in 1996 and the National Midget Auto Racing Hall of Fame in 1997.

Television Appearance
Thomson was a contestant on Bud Collyer's "Beat The Clock".

Complete AAA/USAC Championship Car results

Reference:

Indianapolis 500 results

World Championship career summary
The Indianapolis 500 was part of the FIA World Championship from 1950 through 1960. Drivers competing at Indy during those years were credited with World Championship points and participation. Johnny Thomson participated in 8 World Championship races. He started on the pole once, set 1 fastest lead lap, and finished on the podium once, accumulating a total of 10 World Championship points.

References

External links

1922 births
1960 deaths
Indianapolis 500 drivers
Indianapolis 500 polesitters
National Sprint Car Hall of Fame inductees
Racing drivers who died while racing
Sportspeople from Lowell, Massachusetts
Sports deaths in Pennsylvania
Racing drivers from Massachusetts
AAA Championship Car drivers